Doodia media, also known as rasp fern (or pukupuku in Māori), is a fern species in the family Blechnaceae. The species was formally described by botanist Robert Brown in 1810. Distribution of the species includes New Zealand's North Island and the upper part of the South Island (Nelson and Marlborough). It is also found in Australia and Lord Howe Island.

Young fronds contain flavonoids that protect them from ultraviolet radiation and give them a pink colour.

Phylogenic studies have shown that the genus Doodia is embedded within the paraphyletic genus Blechnum, when that genus is broadly circumscribed. Christenhusz et al., 2011, therefore reassigned all Doodia species to Blechnum.  was transferred to Blechnum medium and Doodia media subsp. australis (Doodia australis) was transferred to Blechnum parrisii. Other sources, such as World Ferns, based on the Pteridophyte Phylogeny Group classification, split Blechnum, accepting Doodia.

References

 New Zealand journal of botany. 2006. vol. 18

Blechnaceae
Ferns of Oceania
Ferns of New Zealand
Flora of Lord Howe Island
Flora of New South Wales
Flora of Queensland
Flora of the Tubuai Islands
Flora of Victoria (Australia)
Plants described in 1810